Baabarr is a 2009 gangster Hindi film directed by Ashu Trikha. The film stars Sohum Shah , Mithun Chakraborty and Urvashi Sharma.

Cast
Sohum Shah as Baabarr Qureshi
Mahesh Chandra Deva as tabrez gang
Rahil Haider as Child Babbarr Qureshi
Urvashi Sharma as Ziya
Mukesh Tiwari as Nawaz
Govind Namdeo as Bhaiyaa Jee
Om Puri as Daroga Chaturvedi
Tinu Anand as Mamu
Sushant Singh as Tabrez
Kashish as Aafreen
Shakti Kapoor as Sarfaraaz
Rakesh Deewana as Nanha
Mahesh Chandra Deva as tabrez gang

Music
"O Maula" - Anand Raj Anand
""Maula Ye Bataa (unplugged) - Anand Raj Anand
Pagal Manwa" - Raka Mukherjee
"Baabarr" - Sukhwinder Singh
"Baaje Raat Ke Bara" - Sunidhi Chauhan

Legal issues
A PIL was filed in the Bombay High Court seeking a ban on Baabarr for alleged negative portrayal of Muslims. The petitioner also charged that characters in the film were based on Mulayam Singh Yadav and Mayawati.

Critical reception
Baabarr is not much liked by the critics. Taran Adarsh of Bollywood Hungama gave 3.5 out of 5 stars. The Times of India gave 2.5 out of 5 stars & stated that "The film is not much impressive as expected, director Ashu Trikha & writer Ikram Akhtar did a well job but the thing making it unimpressive is that the director gets only the mood right, not the scenes, though the reviewer praised the performance of Om Puri by saying that it is Om Puri as the oily, wily and crooked cop, who steals the show". Martin D'Souza of Bollywood Trade News Network gave it 1 out of 5 stars & said by calling the film a repetition that "the film is of old story with new cast & crew, Martin specially criticises the decision of making film with lead role of Soham Shah"

Box office

Baabarr grossed £2,748 on 18 Sep 2009 & £1,439 on 11 Sep 2009 according to Bollywood hungama.

Awards
Recently the cast and crew of the film visited Asian Academy of Film & Television and they have been honoured with the life membership of International Film And Television Club.

References

External links
 

2009 films
2000s Hindi-language films
Films scored by Anand Raj Anand
Films directed by Ashu Trikha
Indian gangster films